The Sankt Andreasberg Observatory, also called Harz Observatory, is a project of the charitable society Sternwarte Sankt Andreasberg e. V., which translates into Sankt Andreasberg Observatory registered society. It was opened in August 2014 and is supposed to become the first completely barrier free Observatory in Germany. The society's expressive goal is to make the sky accessible to all people, whether they are disabled or not. Celestial observation,  lectures and Workshops convey general astronomical knowledge to visitors.

Location

The Sankt Andreasberg Observatory is located near the Rehberg on the premises of the Internationale Haus Sonnenberg, an international educational facility. It is one of the most elevated observatories in northern Germany. The air in an altitude of 710 metres is especially low on turbidity and since the Harz Nature Park is far away from big cities, there is far less light pollution there then in other parts of northern Germany. According to the Federal Agency for Nature Conservation, Sankt Andreasberg is one of the six best locations for astronomy in Germany. In April 2011 the Sky Quality Meter measured 21,81 mag/arcsec².

History 
The Sankt Andreasberg Observatory Society was founded in 2008, aiming at building and operating an observatory for all people. At first, they wanted to build it from scratch on the Jordanshöhe. However, due to environmental protection constraints, it was decided in July 2013 to rent a building of the Internationale Haus Sonnenberg, about 1 km north of the originally designated site, and to repurpose it as an observatory. The constructions in and around the building were mostly financed by donations. The observatory was opened on August 22, 2014. The eastern front of the building is supposed to be extended by an observation dome.

Equipment 
The outdoor area includes five telescope mounts of different heights, featuring power outlets and data transmission facilities. The association owns several telescopes to be used by guests. A 120 cm reflecting telescope is currently being assembled. Another reflecting telescope, featuring a primary mirror of 400 mm diameter (16″ f/8 Hypergraph) and a computer aided mount of type Knopf MK70S were first used during the STATT 2015 (August 13–16, 2015). The reflecting telescope can be used visually as well as photographically.

Universal design 

The goal is to realise a completely barrier free observatory. It is supposed to be accessible for everybody. Therefore, the building is equipped with sufficiently wide doors, step free access ways and ramps for people with mobility constraints, as well as handrails with Braille inscriptions. Offers and media provided by the observatory address all senses and also consider learning, mental, seeing, hearing and movement constrains.

 

Tactile star charts and models of celestial objects help people with impaired vision to experience these objects and aid in the learning process by enabling the tactile sense. Depending on their kind and design, tactile star charts can be used to illustrate constellations (stars on a plane), proportions and siting (3D model). 3D printed models of the lunar surface, of whole moons, comets and asteroids enable blind people to gather an impression of their surface structure and form.

Talking telescopes enable visually impaired people to experience their own and astronomical objects' spatial orientation. A device utilises the GPS, a compass and an accelerometer to determine its own position and to support users in alignment via vocal commands, as well as naming objects it is aligned to.

Barrier free telescope mounts in the outdoor area enable people with mobility constraints to operate the telescopes. Their stable mounting aids them by enabling the telescopes to be aligned with little physical effort and little shaking. In total, five telescope mounts of different heights are provided.

Live projections from the telescopes to the lecture room enable a big audience to do observations. They assist visually impaired people by enhancing details, that are hard to see in a telescope. For people with mobility constraints, they simplify or enable access to the observation.

A Children's and Youth's academy for Astronomy is planned to be established in cooperation with the Internationale Haus Sonnenberg, focusing on STEM fields and Environmental studies. The observatory also wants to acquire a jib-arm mount for telescopes to be used by smaller people and those in need of a wheelchair.

Sankt Andreasberg Telescope Meet-up 
The society has organised the Sankt Andreasberger Teleskoptreffen (STATT), or Sankt Andreasberg Telescope Meet-up,  in every August since 2009, which has attracted more the 100 people interested in astronomy from all over Germany. In addition to observation opportunities, there is a schedule featuring lectures by prestigious experts. In 2014, when the observatory was officially opened, the annual meet-up of the northern German observatories was held there simultaneously.

Cooperations 
 Bildungsstätte Internationales Haus Sonnenberg
 Braunlage Grammar School
 Andersicht
 Goslar Community College
 Haus der Astronomie, Heidelberg, Fortbildung in Schulen Department
 Netzwerk Norddeutscher Sternwarten
 Associations of disabled people

Awards 
 3rd Place Reiff Bildungspreis für Schulastronomie 2013
 2nd Place Bildungspreis der Region Braunschweig 2014

See also
 List of astronomical observatories
 Stuttgart Observatory
 Sonneberg Observatory
 Starkenburg Observatory

References

External links 

 Sankt Andreasberg Observatory Website (in German)

Astronomical observatories in Germany
Articles containing video clips